Gravy is a sauce often made from the juices of meats that run naturally during cooking and often thickened with wheat flour or corn starch for added texture. The gravy may be further coloured and flavoured with gravy salt (a simple mix of salt and caramel food colouring) or gravy browning (gravy salt dissolved in water) or ready-made cubes and powders can be used as a substitute for natural meat or vegetable extracts. Canned and instant gravies are also available. Gravy is commonly served with biscuits (North America, see biscuits and gravy), roasts, meatloaf, rice, noodles, chips (fries) and mashed potatoes.

History 
Based on current understanding of what a gravy is at its core (a sauce made from meat drippings combined with a thickening agent), one of the earliest recorded instances of a gravy being used is from The Forme of Cury, a cookbook from the 14th century. The term "gravy" is believed to be derived from the French word "gravé" that is found in many medieval French cookbooks. Most of the gravy we know today has its roots firmly planted in French cuisine. French cuisine saw a revival of what was called "sauce cookery" in the 17th century which is where most of the basic ideas of adding a roux to a sauce to make a gravy comes from. As the influence of this style of cooking began to grow, it was expanded upon with influences from various other cultures. During this time one of the most common ingredients that's still used to this day was added, "drawn butter". Gravy began to grow in popularity in the 1800s.

Types

 Brown gravy is the name for a gravy made from the drippings from roasted meat or fowl.  The drippings are cooked on the stovetop at high heat with onions or other vegetables, and then thickened with a thin mixture of water and either wheat flour or cornstarch.
 Cream gravy or white gravy is a bechamel most often used in biscuits and gravy and chicken-fried steak. It is usually cooked with a roux being made of meat and or meat drippings and flour. Milk is typically added and thickened by the roux; once prepared, black pepper and bits of mild sausage or chicken liver are sometimes added. Other common names include country gravy, sawmill gravy, milk gravy, and sausage gravy.
 Egg gravy is a variety of gravy made starting with meat drippings (usually from bacon) followed by flour being used to make a thick roux. Water, broth, or milk is added and the liquid is brought back up to a boil, then salt and peppered to taste. A well-beaten egg is then slowly added while the gravy is stirred or whisked swiftly, cooking the egg immediately and separating it into small fragments in the gravy. Called rich man's gravy in some areas of the southern US.
 Giblet gravy has the giblets of turkey or chicken added when it is to be served with those types of poultry, or uses stock made from the giblets.
 Mushroom gravy is a variety of gravy made with mushrooms.
 Onion gravy is made from large quantities of slowly sweated, chopped onions mixed with stock or wine. Commonly served with bangers and mash, eggs, chops, or other grilled or fried meat which by way of the cooking method would not produce their own gravy.
 Red-eye gravy is a gravy made from the drippings of ham fried in a skillet or frying pan. The pan is deglazed with coffee, giving the gravy its name, and uses no thickening agent. This gravy is a staple of Southern United States cuisine and is usually served over ham, grits or biscuits.
 Vegetable gravy or vegetarian gravy is gravy made with boiled or roasted vegetables. A quick and flavourful vegetable gravy can be made from any combination of vegetable broth or vegetable stock, flour, and one of either butter, oil, or margarine. One recipe uses vegetarian bouillon cubes with cornstarch (corn flour) as a thickener ("cowboy roux"), which is whisked into boiling water. Sometimes vegetable juices are added to enrich the flavour, which may give the gravy a dark green colour. Wine could be added. Brown vegetarian gravy can also be made with savoury yeast extract like Marmite or Vegemite. There are also commercially produced instant gravy granules which are suitable for both vegetarians and vegans, though some of the leading brands are not marketed as being vegetarian.
 Chocolate gravy is a variety of gravy made with fat, flour, cocoa powder, and varying amounts of sugar. This variety is more common in cuisine of the Southern United States and is most often served as a Sunday morning dish with fresh biscuits in the Ozark and Appalachian Mountain regions and Alabama. It is also commonly served on Christmas morning.

Cuisines

In the United Kingdom and Ireland, a Sunday roast is usually served with gravy. It is commonly eaten with beef, pork, chicken or lamb. It is also popular in different parts of England, Scotland, Wales and Ireland to have gravy with just chips (mostly from a fish and chip shop or Chinese takeaway).

In British and Irish cuisine, as well as in the cuisines of Commonwealth countries like Australia, New Zealand, and some areas in Canada, the word gravy refers only to the meat-based sauce derived from meat juices, stock cubes or gravy granules. Use of the word "gravy" does not include other thickened sauces. One of the most popular forms is onion gravy, which is eaten with sausages, Yorkshire pudding and roast meat.

Throughout the United States, gravy is commonly eaten with Thanksgiving foods such as turkey, mashed potatoes and stuffing. One Southern United States variation is sausage gravy eaten with American biscuits. Another Southern US dish that uses white gravy is chicken-fried steak. Rice and gravy is a staple of Cajun and Creole cuisine in the southern US state of Louisiana.

Gravy is an integral part of the Canadian dish poutine. In Quebec, poutine gravy is thin, and is sometimes a mix of beef and chicken stock. Other places in Canada use a thicker gravy, similar to an American gravy.

In some parts of Asia, particularly India, gravy is any thickened liquid part of a dish. For example, the liquid part of a thick curry may be referred to as gravy.

In the Mediterranean, Maghreb cuisine is dominated with gravy and bread-based dishes. Tajine and most Maghreb (Morocco, Algeria and Tunisia) dishes are derivatives of oil, meat and vegetable gravies. The dish is usually served with a loaf of bread. The bread is then dipped into the gravy and then used to gather or scoop the meat and vegetables between the index, middle finger and thumb, and consumed.

In gastronomy of Menorca, it has been used since the English influence during the 17th century in typical Menorcan and Catalan dishes, as for example macarrons amb grevi (pasta).

See also

 Au jus - beef juice
 Cuisine of the Southern United States
 Gravy train (disambiguation)
 List of sauces
 Sauce boat, also referred to as a gravy boat

References

Sauces
Non-Newtonian fluids
Thanksgiving food
Meat-based sauces